Metacriodion is a genus of beetles in the family Cerambycidae, containing the following species:

 Metacriodion capixaba Fragoso, 1970
 Metacriodion pictum (Waterhouse, 1880)

References

Cerambycini